Sunset Carson (born Winifred Maurice Harrison or Michael Harrison; November 12, 1920 – May 1, 1990) was an American B-western star of the 1940s.

Early life, acting

Carson was born on November 12, 1920, at Gracemont, Oklahoma, as either Winifred Maurice Harrison or Michael Harrison, to Maurice Greely Harrison and Azalee Belle McAdams. He moved to Plainview, Texas, as a child (per the 1930 US Census Hale County, Texas). 

Carson became an accomplished rodeo rider in his youth. For a time he worked in a western show owned by early cowboy actor Tom Mix. In 1940 he traveled to South America, where he competed in rodeos for two years. After his return to the U.S., he played small parts in the 1943 film Stage Door Canteen, and the big budget 1944 film Janie, both having him billed as "Michael Harrison". Catching the attention of Republic Pictures executive Lou Grey, he was signed to a contract and given his own series of B-westerns beginning in 1944, changing his name to "Sunset Carson".

Fame and career climb

Within two years, Carson was on the top-10 list of money makers for western stars. He was given a horse named "Cactus", and starred in a string of semi-successful western genre films. In 1944 he starred in Bordertown Trail, Code of the Prairie, and Firebrands of Arizona opposite Smiley Burnette. In 1945 (the peak of his career), his first film was Sheriff of Cimarron, followed by Santa Fe Saddlemates, Bells of Rosarita, Oregon Trail, Bandits of the Badlands, Rough Riders of Cheyenne, and The Cherokee Flash.

In 1946, Carson began the year strong, starring in Days of Buffalo Bill and Alias Billy the Kid. He followed those with The El Paso Kid, Red River Renegades, and Rio Grande Raiders. However, by the end of 1946, Carson and Republic Pictures were having disputes. He claimed the disputes were over his contract. Republic Pictures would later claim that he was fired by Republic creator and executive officer Herbert Yates after attending a studio function while intoxicated and in the company of an underage girl. By year’s end, he and Republic had parted company. He would never again achieve any large degree of acting success.

Career decline, retirement and death

In 1948 he starred for Astor Pictures in Fighting Mustang, Deadline, and Sunset Carson Rides Again. Then in 1949 he starred in Rio Grande, and in 1950 he starred as the lead character, for the last time, in Battling Marshal. By the following year, his career was all but over as a leading actor of the day. For the next several years he obtained small bit parts.

Years later, he played the lead in a B-movie called The Marshal of Windy Hollow (1972), a film that co-starred a host of old time actors, including Ken Maynard, Tex Ritter, and Bill Cody, Jr. He then had a bit part in the film Buckstone County Prison in 1978, and another bit part in the 1985 sci-fi movie Alien Outlaw (his last film role).

He toured for five years with "Tommy Scott's Country Music Circus". In the early 1980s, Carson hosted ″Six-Gun Heroes″, a South Carolina Educational TV (SCETV) show produced by Jim Welch presenting classic B Westerns which still airs on many PBS affiliates across the US. In 1985, Carson appeared in an episode of the television series Simon & Simon.

Death
Carson retired to Reno, Nevada. He died there on May 1, 1990. He was survived by his fifth wife and his two children. He is buried at Highland Memorial Gardens in Jackson, Madison County, Tennessee.

Filmography
 Call of the Rockies (1944) co-starred Kirk Alyn, Smiley Burnette
 Bordertown Trail (1944)
 Code of the Prairie (1944) co-starred Roy Barcroft
 Firebrands of Arizona (1944) co-starred Roy Barcroft
 Sheriff of Cimarron (1945) co-starred Linda Stirling
 Santa Fe Saddlemates (1945) co-starred Roy Barcroft, Kenne Duncan, Linda Stirling
 Bells of Rosarita (1945) co-starred Roy Rogers, Red Barry, Rocky Lane and Gabby Hayes
 Oregon Trail (1945) co-starred Kenne Duncan, Monte Hale
 Bandits of the Badlands (1945) co-starred Monte Hale
 Rough Riders of Cheyenne (1945) co-starred Monte Hale, Kenne Duncan
 The Cherokee Flash (1945) co-starred Linda Stirling, Roy Barcroft
 Days of Buffalo Bill (1946)
 Alias Billy the Kid (1946) co-starred Roy Barcroft
 The El Paso Kid  (1946)
 Red River Renegades (1946) co-starred Kenne Duncan
 Rio Grande Raiders  (1946) co-starred Linda Stirling, Bob Steele (actor), Tris Coffin, Kenne Duncan, Bobby Barber
 Fighting Mustang (1948)
 Deadline (1948)
 Sunset Carson Rides Again (1948) co-starred Ron Ormond
 Rio Grande (1949)
 Battling Marshal (1950)
 The Marshal of Windy Hollow (1972)
 Buckstone County Prison (1978)
 Alien Outlaw (1985)

References

External links

Sunset Carson at b-westerns.com
 Encyclopedia of Oklahoma History and Culture - Carson, Sunset

Male Western (genre) film actors
Male actors from Oklahoma
American male film actors
1920 births
1990 deaths
20th-century American male actors